The Archipelago of Lake Saint Pierre counts 103 islands in the western part of Lake Saint Pierre, in Quebec, in Canada. There are two groups: Islands of Berthier to the north and the islands of Sorel to the south.

The shores of this archipelago has twenty-two coastal villages. Around 2600 people were living on those islands in 2011. Islands Dupas and Saint-Ignace-de-Loyola are partially urbanized. The majority of the other islands are used for agriculture and grazing farm animals.

A network of small roads, often unpaved crosses the riparian environment of the islands. The islands of Saint-Ignace-de-Loyola, Dupas and Castors (Beavers) are connected to the north side of St. Lawrence River by a small network of bridges. The connection between the two sides of St. Lawrence River) is provided by a ferry service between Sorel and Saint-Ignace Island (the largest island of the archipelago). Most of the other islands are accessible only by boat. The south side of the river, the "Île des Embarras" (Embarrassment Island) is the smallest of the inhabited islands.

Geology 

The Archipelago of Lake Saint Pierre is a delta from the last glaciation and modified by the alluvium of St. Lawrence River. Following the withdrawal of the ice cap, the Sorel Islands region was invaded by the Champlain Sea which is then withdrawn gradually, about 12000 years ago. Clayey marine sediments were deposited at the bottom of the water.

The visible part of the islands of the Archipelago is formed of recent alluvium. Today, the same phenomenon is repeated annually during spring flooding while the waters of the river cover a portion of the Sorel Islands and will leave a layer alluvium. Although they can cause problems and damage to the island for a few weeks to travel, the spring floods are beneficial to agriculture.

Topography 

The St. Lawrence River widens the entrance of Lake Saint Pierre which forms a delta archipelago of hundreds of islands and islets. Several channels crisscross between these islands. This region is characterized by a very few marked relief.

Climate 

This region plays a northern continental climate, slightly cooler than area Montreal but much more sunny. Frost-free period is long, which favors cereal crop production. In winter there is not too severe with rainfall and bit excessive cold.

Hydrography 

The disproportion between the contribution of banks is impressive; the report is favourable to ten against one for the south shore to the Archipelago.

Wildlife 

Islands and Lake Saint Pierre is the most important migratory stopover in eastern Canada for waterfowl. The ecological value of these wetlands has been recognized by the UNESCO in 2000.

Human history on islands 

These are the first Native Americans who inhabited and frequented the Archipelago are deriving their livelihood from the fauna of the islands. Jacques Cartier mentions in his travel in September 1535. On 29 June 1603, it was the turn of Samuel de Champlain to observe Amerindian. Then in August 1642, is the foundation of a wooden fort. This in order to repel the attacks of Iroquois on Trois-Rivières. The fort was burned by the Iroquois in 1647. It was not until 1665 that a new fort was rebuilt by the company of Captain Pierre de Saurel from Carignan.

A few years later, in 1672, demobilized soldiers are the first settlers in the Archipelago. The exploitation of communal grazing on the islands finds its origin here. Agriculture fits this Archipelago of floodplains and in 1710 the population of the manor is 112 people. The population is concentrated in the Beaver Islands, Dupas, Saint-Ignace and Isle Madame at the north of the Archipelago.

In the late 1920s, several dams stones were built upstream channels to raise the water level in the shipping channel that runs south of the Archipelago.

Many summer cottages on pillories were erected along the "chenal aux corbeaux" (Ravens channel), between the Crows and Lapierre Islands. This is the corner of the country Le Survenant (roman) (French novel) described in the two novels written by Germaine Guèvremont The Outlander (written in 1945) and Marie-Didace (written in 1947). The characters in these two novels are associated with the Sorel Islands. Germaine Guèvremont lived for nearly 30 years on the Îlette Pé (near the "Chenal du moyne" - Channel of the monk) and her house became for some years the Museum of Scripture.

Partial list of 103 islands 

Here is a partial list of islands (50/103) (listed as French toponyms):.

 île aux Foins
 île du Mitan
 île du Sablé
 île aux Cochons
 île aux Castors
 île Dupas
 île Saint-Amour
 île Saint-Ignace
 île Ronde
 île Madame
 île aux Ours
 île de Grâce
 île aux Corbeaux
 île à la Pierre
 île des Barques
 île du Moine
 île Bibeau
 île Létourneau
 îles aux Fantômes
 île Lacroix
 île d'Embarras
 île Saint-Jean
 île Saint-Pierre
 île à la Perche
 île au Citron
 île Millette
 île de Rouche
 îles aux Raisins
 Islets Percés
 île aux Vaches
 île du Curé
 île des Plantes
 île Ducharme
 île à l'Orme
 île aux Noyers
 île Lamarche
 île à la Cavale
 île du Nord
 île du Milieu
 la Grande Île
 îles aux Sables
 île Plate
 île à Letendre
 île de la Traverse
 île Péloquin
 île Cardin
 îles de la Girodeau
 Le Nid d'Aigle
 île à la Grenouille
 îles aux Grues

See also

See also
 Lake Saint Pierre
 Saint Lawrence Seaway
 Saint Lawrence River
 List of longest rivers of Canada
 List of Quebec rivers
 List of crossings of the Saint Lawrence River
 Biosphere reserve of Lac-Saint-Pierre
 Biophare Museum
 Champlain Sea
 Saint Lawrence Lowlands

References

External links 
 Sorel-Tracy

Pierre-De Saurel Regional County Municipality
Lake islands of Quebec
Landforms of Lanaudière
Landforms of Montérégie
Archipelagoes of Canada